The McLaren M23 was a Formula One racing car designed by Gordon Coppuck, with input from John Barnard, and built by the McLaren team. It was a development of the McLaren M16 Indianapolis 500 car. A Ford Cosworth DFV engine was used, which was prepared by specialist tuning company Nicholson-McLaren Engines. This helped push the DFV's horsepower output to around 490 bhp.

A total of 13 chassis were built, with serial numbers 1 to 12 and 14. No number 13 chassis was built, as it was deemed to be unlucky.

History

1973

The M19 had reached the end of its development life and a new design was needed to keep pace with the latest generation of Formula One cars and regulations regarding deformable crash protection structures. Taking inspiration from the M16 Indycar and utilising the M19's rear suspension design, the new M23 was introduced for the 1973 season, and scored pole position with Denny Hulme on its very first outing. Hulme and Peter Revson took three wins between them that season, while rookie Jody Scheckter nearly added a fourth. Scheckter was responsible for one of the biggest accidents Formula One has ever seen, at the 1973 British Grand Prix, when he spun his M23 in front of the pack.

1974

His knowledge of the Lotus 72 helped McLaren develop the M23 and that season Fittipaldi gave McLaren its first drivers' and constructors' world championships, beating Ferrari, Tyrrell and Lotus with four wins. 

The season saw Marlboro become title sponsors of the team, which they would continue to be so until 1996. Fittipaldi worked on improving the car; a wider track and longer wheelbase were adopted. The revised M23 featured redesigned bodywork, wings and aerodynamics were introduced during the year. 

Fittipaldi took three wins, while Hulme won once in a closely fought season.

1975

Further development in 1975 – including a 6-speed gearbox, a novelty for the time – helped Fittipaldi to second in the drivers' championship behind Niki Lauda, who had the benefit of Ferrari's 312T chassis and McLaren to third in the constructors' championship, behind Ferrari and Brabham.

The team experimented with different bodywork styles, including aerodynamic kickups in front of the rear wheels, different nose profiles and extended bodywork in front of the rear wheels, housing the oil coolers. 

Also making an appearance were side mounted skirts which sealed the underside of the car to the racetrack, a precursor to the ground effect technology first seen properly with the Lotus 78.
Most of these changes were adopted for the M23 and its successor, the McLaren M26.

1976
At the end of 1975 Fittipaldi left the team to join his brother's Copersucar-sponsored Fittipaldi Automotive team. He was replaced by James Hunt, who went on to win a dramatic and controversial 1976 season with the final evolution M23, the M23D. 

New regulations outlawing the tall airboxes over the engines were introduced for the Spanish Grand Prix. As a result the M23 sported mid mounted air scoops on either side of the roll bar. The oil coolers were repositioned to be in front of the rear wheels. 

James Hunt won six races on his way to the world championship.

1977
The M26 was seen as the future and development had ended on the M23 by the end of 1976. However, when the new car proved troublesome, Hunt and Jochen Mass relied on the M23 in the early part of the 1977 season, and even though the car was now four years old it was still competitive, earning several pole positions and podium finishes. 

Gilles Villeneuve made his Grand Prix debut at the 1977 British Grand Prix in an M23.

The M23 was never the most technically advanced F1 car, but sound preparation and continual development helped it win 16 Grands Prix, two drivers' and one constructors' world championships in its lifetime.

The M23 was also modified for use in Formula 5000 racing. Australian driver John McCormack drove a Leyland powered M23 to win the 1977 Australian Drivers' Championship. McCormack also put his M23 on pole for the 1978 Australian Grand Prix.

Complete Formula One World Championship results
(key) (results in bold indicate pole position; results in italics indicate fastest lap)

* 12 points in  scored using the M19A and M19C
* 39 points in  scored using the M26
* All points in  scored using the McLaren M26

References

 F1 Racing magazine, January 2001
 Motor Sport (magazine), August 2002

External links

McLaren Formula One cars
1973 Formula One season cars
1974 Formula One season cars
1975 Formula One season cars
1976 Formula One season cars
1977 Formula One season cars
1978 Formula One season cars
Formula 5000 cars
Formula One championship-winning cars